Lindberg is an extinct town in Lewis County, in the U.S. state of Washington. The GNIS lists location as unknown, however period maps (1920-1930 census districts) show Lindberg on State Route 7, about three miles north of the U.S. Route 12 junction, where the East Fork Tilton River joins Tilton River.

Background
A post office called Lindberg was established in 1911, and remained in operation until 1925. While pushing through the last leg of the Tacoma Eastern Railroad from Ashford (1904) to Morton (1910), they established a station at the crossing of East Fork Tilton River called Glenavon. In 1911, Gustaf Lindberg, established a logging camp and company town near the Glenavon station, which in addition to the logging camp included a shingle mill and saw mill. Due to financial difficulties, Lindberg lost his property in the mid 1920s, but the camp continued with the name Lindberg & Hoby Logging Camp into the 1940s. As of 1928, there were two train stops bracketing Lindberg, East Fork (formerly Glenavon) to the north and Coal Canyon to the south, the latter name eventually replaced Lindberg. The area shows few signs of the logging operation, but both sides of the road through this section are dotted with houses and businesses, all of which bear a Morton address, though they are outside the limits of the town proper.

References

Ghost towns in Lewis County, Washington